Brian Scott Meyer (born January 29, 1963) is an American former Major League Baseball (MLB) pitcher who played for the Houston Astros from  to .

Biography

A native of Camden, New Jersey, Meyer's high school coach was former minor league baseball player Lew Watts. Meyer attended Rollins College. In 1985 he played collegiate summer baseball with the Harwich Mariners of the Cape Cod Baseball League and was named a league all-star. He was selected by the Astros in the 16th round of the 1986 MLB Draft.

References

External links

1963 births
Living people
American expatriate baseball players in Canada
Auburn Astros players
Baseball players from Camden, New Jersey
Calgary Cannons players
Canton-Akron Indians players
Columbus Astros players
Harwich Mariners players
Houston Astros players
Major League Baseball pitchers
Osceola Astros players
Rollins Tars baseball players
Tucson Toros players